Tony Satini (born 29 August 1993) is a Tonga international rugby league footballer who plays as a  for the North Sydney Bears in the NSW Cup. 

He previously played for the Manly Warringah Sea Eagles and the Mount Pritchard Mounties.

Background
Satini was born in Blacktown, New South Wales, Australia. He is of Tongan descent.

He played junior rugby union for the Blacktown Scorpions and junior rugby league for the Glenmore Park Brumbies. He was then signed by the Penrith Panthers.

Playing career

Early career
From 2011 to 2013, Satini played for the Penrith Panthers' NYC team, captaining the side in 2013. In October 2013, he signed a contract with the Manly Warringah Sea Eagles starting in 2014.

2014
In Round 3 of the 2014 NRL season, Satini made his NRL debut for the Sea Eagles against the Parramatta Eels. On 19 October, he played for Tonga against Papua New Guinea.

2015

In August, Satini re-signed with the Sea Eagles on a 1-year contract until the end of 2016.

2016
After failing to make a first-grade appearance in the 2015 and 2016 seasons, Satini was released at the end of the year. Late in the year, he rejoined his old club Penrith for the 2017 season.

2017
Satini scored a try in Penrith's 20-12 victory over Wyong in The 2017 Intrust Super Premiership NSW grand final. The following week Satini scored four tries for Penrith in their 42-18 win over The PNG Hunters in The 2017 NRL State Championship final.

2018
In 2018, Satini was selected to play for the NSW residents against the QLD residents side.

2019
On 6 May, Satini was selected for the Canterbury Cup NSW residents side to play against the Queensland residents representative team.

Satini played for Mounties in their elimination final loss against Newtown at Campbelltown Stadium.

2020
Santini played for the Mounties in 2020.

2021
After being released by Mounties, Santini signed a contract to play for North Sydney in the NSW Cup.  He made his debut in round 1 of the competition, a 48-20 loss against Blacktown Workers.

References

External links

Penrith Panthers profile
NRL profile
Yahoo New Zealand profile

1993 births
Living people
Australian rugby league players
Australian sportspeople of Tongan descent
Tonga national rugby league team players
Manly Warringah Sea Eagles players
Rugby league centres
Rugby league players from Blacktown
Windsor Wolves players